Statistics of Empress's Cup in the 1979 season.

Overview
It was contested by 8 teams, and FC Jinnan won the championship.

Results

Quarterfinals
FC Jinnan 7-1 Nishiyama High School
AC Plum 0-8 Shimizudaihachi SC
Shimizu FC Mama 3-1 Mitsubishi Heavy Industries
Jissen Women's University 0-3 Takatsuki FC

Semifinals
FC Jinnan 2-1 Shimizudaihachi SC
Shimizu FC Mama 0-5 Takatsuki FC

Final
FC Jinnan 2-1 Takatsuki FC
FC Jinnan won the championship.

References

Empress's Cup
1979 in Japanese women's football